Chief Kairouane (or Kaierouane) was a Kalinago (Carib) leader of Grenada. For years, he led the resistance against European colonists attempting to establish a foothold on the island.  In a sudden turn of affairs, however, he led a small band of survivors who had rejected slavery on a deadly escape over a cliff, which the French named Morne de Sauteurs or “Leapers Hill.”  Today his daring act is mythologized as a reminder of the Indigenous resistance in the region.

Resistance to European assault
Since the arrival of the Spanish to the Caribbean islands, the Kalinago of the Lesser Antilles successfully resisted the interlopers.  They kept the Spanish at bay in Puerto Rico and out of the islands to the south.  With the Spanish decline in the region after the 1590s, the Kalinago enjoyed a short respite. The early 1600s, however, soon saw the arrival of the more economically aggressive English, Dutch and the French, who came to challenge the Spanish supremacy in the area.  These nations had chosen to cross the "poison arrow curtain" and face the Kalinago forces believing that their islands would be easier to conquer than the Spanish fortified settlements on the Greater Antilles.

Arrival at Grenada
The Kalinagos, confronted with what was now a war of retreat, reorganized their communities for a protracted conflict and chose even smaller islands which they could defend more effectively. European colonists appeared with some regularity, but because of the resistance they soon encountered, none had yet attempted to establish a plantation in Grenada until 1649. On March, the French governor of Martinique, Jacques du Parquet, arrived with a strong contingent and in a week erected a settlement under the watchful eye of Chief Kairouane and his men.   Then, the Kalingo warriors came out of hiding, with the chief wearing his kingly attire.  The meeting resulted in a peaceful agreement.

See also
Saint Patrick Parish, Grenada
History of Grenada

External links
Leaping To Oblivion - A Caribbean Culture Ends At Caribs Leap, Grenada, Youtube

References

Grenadian rebels
History_of_Grenada
Date of birth missing
Place of birth missing
Date of death missing
Place of death missing
17th-century rulers in North America